The Ream National Park, officially the Preah Sihanouk Ream National Park, is a national park of Cambodia located  from the city of Sihanoukville in the Sihanoukville Municipality of the Sihanoukville Province in southwestern Cambodia. It was established in 1993, as the Cambodian government began to take action for the protection of the country's threatened natural resources. The national park's biological value is defined by its combination of rivers, forests, mangroves, estuaries, beaches, coral reefs, wildlife, and marine life.

Geography
Ream National Park constitutes the south-east of Prey Nob district of the Sihanoukville Province bordering the Gulf of Thailand. The landscape of the park is mountainous with a range of habitats and ecosystems including mangrove forests, freshwater wetlands, sea grass beds, evergreen forests, beaches, coral reefs, rivers, and islands. The Park is divided by a freshwater river called the Prek Teuk Sap, which flows through the Park to the ocean. Land to the west of the river is dominated by two larger hills. These hills are separated by the Prek Sampouch watercourse. Located on the most western side of the park is Phnom Mollou. Between the hills and the estuary of the Prek Teuk Sap lies a narrow discontinuous belt of wetlands. These wetlands are protected by an even thinner band of degraded mangrove forest. The islands of Koh Thmei and Koh Seh comprise the eastern third of the park.

Natural resources
Wildlife found or reported in the national park includes, but is not limited to: rhesus monkeys, dugongs, turtles, dolphins, mouse-deer, Sarus crane, and pelicans. 
Vegetation habitats of the park include lowland evergreen forest, melaleuca forests, and mangrove forest. Despite all this, the National Park is a substantial local economic resource. Almost 30,000 people or 5,500 households live in the five communes that overlap or border Ream National Park, and population growth rates are estimated at nearly 3%. Four of these communes are located on the boundary of Ream, and a total of 13 villages have land lying within the Park’s boundaries.

Legal status
A wide range of groups and individuals have converging and diverging interests or stakes in the park’s resources. Park authorities have to deal daily with all stakeholders. Consensus is not always possible since the resources of the park can only support limited levels of exploitation. Stakeholders are: local communities, commercial loggers, police, The Navy, Ministry of Environment, Rangers, United Nations Development Programme, land speculators, commercial fishermen, and tourists. Dubious land-lease concessions had mostly emerged from our around these groups of people. The subsequent hype gained momentum until dealings in highest circles of government were reported. Any issuance of land title certificate in this community area shall be required to obtain a prior approval from the Ministry of Environment in compliance with the Land Law."

See also
Ream Naval Base
Koh Thmei
Koh Seh
Sihanoukville

References

External links

Ream National Park in the UNEP-WCMC World Database on Protected Areas (WDPA) from the World Conservation Monitoring Centre
 Cambodia Island Wild life List of islands

National parks of Cambodia
Protected areas established in 1993
Geography of Sihanoukville province